Mandeep Singh (born 25 January 1995) is an Indian professional field hockey player who currently plays as a forward for Delhi Waveriders in the Hockey India League and the India men's national field hockey team.

Career

Early career
Singh played field hockey as a youth player for Surjit Hockey Academy which is based in his hometown of Jalandhar, Punjab.

Ranchi Rhinos
On 16 December 2012 Singh was brought in the first ever Hockey India League auction by the franchise Ranchi Rhinos for a winning bid of $13,000. He made his debut for the Rhinos on 16 January 2013 against Punjab Warriors at the Surjit Hockey Stadium in Ranchi's first ever Hockey India League match in their history and he scored the second goal for the team 50 minutes into the game as the Rhino's ran out 2–1 winners. He then scored his second goal of the season in the next match against Mumbai Magicians on 18 January 2013 at the Astroturf Hockey Stadium in Ranchi, Jharkhand when he scored 22 minutes into the game as Ranchi won the match 3–1. Singh then scored his third goal of the season on 23 January 2013 against Delhi Waveriders at the Astroturf Hockey Stadium when he scored 60 minutes into the match; however his goal was not enough as Ranchi lost the match 4–5. He then scored his first double of his career on 26 January 2013 against Uttar Pradesh Wizards at the Dhyan Chand Astroturf Stadium when he scored 58 minutes into the match as well as 67 minutes into the match as he led Ranchi to a 3–1 victory. Singh then won his first man of the match award on 28 January 2013 after he scored the winning goal for Ranchi Rhinos against the Mumbai Magicians at the Astroturf Hockey Stadium when he managed to find the net 49 minutes into the match to give Ranchi a 2–1 victory.

Singh then began the month of February with a goal on 2 February 2013 against Punjab Warriors at the Astroturf Hockey Stadium when he found the net 34 minutes into the game as Ranchi drew the match 1–1. He then scored his final goal of the regular season on 4 February 2013 against the Punjab Warriors at the Surjit Hockey Stadium when he scored 62 minutes into the game as Ranchi Rhinos won 3–2.

Singh then played his first match for Ranchi Rhinos in the Hockey India League play-offs on 9 February 2013 against the Uttar Pradesh Wizards at the Astroturf Hockey Stadium in the semi-finals in which he helped Ranchi Rhinos reach the final of the Hockey India League with two goals he scored 5 minutes into the game and 66 minutes into the game; Ranchi won the match 4–2. Then in the final Singh managed to help Ranchi Rhinos win the league title over the Delhi Waveriders on 10 February 2013 at the Astroturf Hockey Stadium.

After the season ended Singh won the Hockey India League's Ponty Chadha Trophy for the Upcoming Player of the Tournament award after scoring ten goals in thirteen matches and being the second top scorer throughout the tournament.

International
After an amazing showing during the 2013 Hockey India League season, Singh then made his debut for the India men's national field hockey team on 18 February 2013 during the second round of the 2012–14 Hockey World League against Fiji in which India routed the opposition to come out as 16–0 winners. Singh then scored his first ever international goal on 20 February 2013 against Oman in which he scored 42 minutes into the game as India ran out 9–1 winners.

Statistics

Domestic

International

Honours

Domestic

Ranchi Rhinos
 Hockey India League: 2013

Individual
 Ponty Chadha Trophy for the Upcoming Player of the Tournament (2013)
 Best Junior Player of the 2012–14 Men's FIH Hockey World League Final(2014)

References

External links
Mandeep Singh at Hockey India

1995 births
Living people
Indian male field hockey players
Field hockey players from Jalandhar
Male field hockey forwards
Hockey India League players
Ranchi Rhinos players
Olympic field hockey players of India
Field hockey players at the 2020 Summer Olympics
2014 Men's Hockey World Cup players
Field hockey players at the 2018 Commonwealth Games
Field hockey players at the 2022 Commonwealth Games
Commonwealth Games silver medallists for India
Commonwealth Games medallists in field hockey
Field hockey players at the 2018 Asian Games
2018 Men's Hockey World Cup players
Asian Games bronze medalists for India
Asian Games medalists in field hockey
Medalists at the 2018 Asian Games
Olympic bronze medalists for India
Medalists at the 2020 Summer Olympics
Olympic medalists in field hockey
Recipients of the Arjuna Award
2023 Men's FIH Hockey World Cup players
Medallists at the 2022 Commonwealth Games